is a city located in Saitama Prefecture, Japan. , the city had an estimated population of 92,512 in 44,288 households and a population density of 5100 persons per km².

Geography
Located in far southeastern Saitama Prefecture at an elevation of only three meters above sea level, Yashio is on the central reaches of the Naka River, and is approximately 20 kilometers from downtown Tokyo.

Surrounding municipalities
 Saitama Prefecture
 Sōka
 Misato
 Tokyo Metropolis
 Adachi
 Katsushika

Climate
Yashio has a humid subtropical climate (Köppen Cfa) characterized by warm summers and cool winters with light to no snowfall.  The average annual temperature in Yashio is 14.9 °C. The average annual rainfall is 1482 mm with September as the wettest month. The temperatures are highest on average in August, at around 26.5 °C, and lowest in January, at around 3.4 °C.

Demographics
Per Japanese census data, the population of Yashio has increased rapidly over the past 60 years.

History
The area of modern Yashio was settled in the Kofun period and was part of Shimōsa Province from the Nara period. During the Edo period Tokugawa shogunate, the area was tenryō territory controlled directly by the shogunate. After the Meiji restoration, the area was transferred to the new Saitama Prefecture in 1871 and divided into villages with the creation of the modern municipalities system in 1889. The village of Yashio was created within Minamisaitama District, Saitama with the merger of the villages of Shiodome, Hachijō and Yahata on 28 September 1956. It was raised to town status on 1 October 1964 and to city status on 15 January 1972.

Government
Yashio has a mayor-council form of government with a directly elected mayor and a unicameral city council of 21 members. Yashio contributes one member to the Saitama Prefectural Assembly. In terms of national politics, the city is part of Saitama 14th district of the lower house of the Diet of Japan.

Economy
Due to this location, Yashio is primarily a distribution center, with a number of industrial parks. It is also bedroom community with part of its population commuting to the Tokyo metropolis for work.

Education
Yashio has ten public elementary schools and five public middle schools operated by the city government, and two public high schools operated by the Saitama Prefectural Board of Education.

Transportation

Railway
 Metropolitan Intercity Railway Company - Tsukuba Express

Highway
  Shuto Expressway Misato Route

Noted people from Yashio
Yohei Otake, professional soccer player
Kan Otake, professional baseball player

References

External links

Official Website 

Cities in Saitama Prefecture
Yashio, Saitama